is a Japanese audio engineering company headquartered in Chiyoda, Tokyo, Japan. The company name emphasises symbiosis of analog and digital technologies (implemented, for example, in a volume control subsystem); the logo symbolizes an input pin jack (left square), output pin jack (right square) and an innovative signal processing unit in between.

Technology
Digital do MaiN's power amplifiers use V-FET technology transistors. Initially developed by Nippon Gakki Seizo K.K. in the 1970s (US Patent 4,216,038), the technology was improved, and the 2SK77B transistor was released. As V-FET devices are no longer manufactured, Digital do MaiN builds them itself. Original design and usage of the 2SK77B V-FET transistor give amplifiers characteristics similar to vacuum tube devices and Triode class A amplifiers which feature very high quality of output sound and cancellation of most of the even distortion harmonics, and allow noise distortion to be less than 0.005% and no loss of original harmonics. Digital do MaiN also uses technologies and complementary products from its partners: MSB Technology's (USA) DACs, Cabasse (France) loudspeakers, Denon (Japan) waveform reproduction technology.

Awards
Japanese Audio Excellence Award 2009, Separate Digital Players category (D-1a D/A converter) and Main Amplifiers category (B-1a power amplifier)

References

Further reading
Pictures from 2009 Tokyo International Audio Show
Interview with founder Mr. Kazuhiko Nishi (in Japanese)

Audio equipment manufacturers of Japan
Manufacturing companies based in Tokyo
Japanese brands